Scelio is a large genus (at least 240 and possibly 500 species), the largest within the family Scelionidae, of parasitic wasp whose known target host include the eggs of grasshoppers (Acrididae, Orthoptera). They are found worldwide and some species have been implemented as biological control agents.

See also
 List of Scelio species

References 

Scelioninae
Biological pest control wasps
Insects used as insect pest control agents
Hymenoptera genera